Éric Judor (born 25 July 1968 in Meaux), sometimes simply called Éric, is a French actor, director, screenwriter and comedian. He gained notoriety by forming, with Ramzy Bedia, the comedy duo Eric and Ramzy.

After several feature films with his friend Ramzy, he began a career as a solo comic actor. He created, wrote and produced the series Platane (2011-2019) for Canal +, but he is also the headliner of the comedies Mohamed Dubois (2013), Problemos (2017) and Roulez jeunesse (2018). He plays in particular in the series H (1998-2002) which made him particularly known with his friend Ramzy Bedia and Jamel Debbouze.

Life and career
Judor's father was from Guadeloupe and his mother from Austria. After being a tour guide in the United States for two years and then in Canada, he worked as a logistics coordinator at Bouygues. He now lives in Dampierre-en-Yvelines with his wife and two daughters, Jana and Luna.

Youth and training
Éric Judor, was born on July 25, 1968, in Meaux1, to a French father from Guadeloupe and an Austrian mother2.
At the age of 18, he attempted a career as a professional tennis player in the United States. The results do not follow, he does not persevere. However, he would have beaten Hicham Arazi, twice quarter-finalist at Roland Garros, while he was ranked three hundredth in the world ranking3. He distinguished himself in particular during this match by an exceptional passing-shot in tweener (shot between the legs with his back to the net).
After working as a tourist guide in the United States for two years and then in Canada4, he was recruited as a logistician at Bouygues5. There he organized the schedules of the engineers who worked on the oil platforms6.

Filmography

Films
Le Ciel, les Oiseaux et... ta mère ! (1999) as the journalist
La Tour Montparnasse Infernale (2001) as Eric
Pecan Pie (2003) as Gas Station Attendant
Double Zéro (2004) as Benoît "Ben" Rivière
Les Dalton (2004), Joe Dalton
Once Upon a Time in the Oued (2005) as a shopkeeper
Barfuss (2005) as the man in the car
Steak  (2007) as Blaze/Chuck
Seuls Two (2008) as Gervais
Lascars (2009) as Chinese Man/Airport Security Guard
Neuilly sa mère ! (2009) as the inner city mediator
Bacon on the Side (2010) as The vigil
Halal Police d'État (2011) as the Kabyle
Au Bistro du Coin (2011) as the nurse
Hénaut Président (2011) as Himself
Les Seigneurs (2012) as George
Wrong (2012) as Victor
Mohamed Dubois (2013) as Mohamed Dubois
Wrong Cops (2014) as Rough
The New Adventures of Aladdin (2015) as the Genie
La Tour 2 contrôle infernale (2016) as Ernest Krakenkriek
Hibou (2016) as Marius
Problemos (2017) as Victor
Alad'2 (2018) as the Genie
The Last Mercenary (2021) as Paul Lesueur

Television
Jamais deux sans toi...t (1995) as Plateau
H (1998–2002) as Aymé Cesaire
Ratz (2003) as Razmo
Moot-Moot (2007) as Bernard MootMoot
Platane (2011–2019) as Eric; also creator, director and producer
Bref (2012) as Jean-Paul
Weekend Family (2022-) as Fred

References

External links

 
 

1969 births
Living people
French comedians
French male film actors
French male television actors
French people of Austrian descent
French people of Guadeloupean descent
People from Meaux